The NBA's Defensive Player of the Year Award is an annual National Basketball Association (NBA) award given since the 1982–83 NBA season to the best defensive player of the regular season. The winner is selected by a panel of 124 sportswriters and broadcasters throughout the United States and Canada, each of whom casts a vote for first, second and third place selections. Each first-place vote is worth five points, second-place votes are worth three points, and a third-place vote is worth one. The player with the highest point total, regardless of the number of first-place votes, wins the award. Starting in the 2022–23 NBA season, the winner of this award will receive the Hakeem Olajuwon trophy, named after the two–time defensive player of the year winner.

Dikembe Mutombo and Ben Wallace have each won the award a record four times. Rudy Gobert and Dwight Howard have won the award three times, with Howard having won it in three consecutive seasons. Sidney Moncrief, Mark Eaton, Dennis Rodman, Hakeem Olajuwon, Alonzo Mourning and Kawhi Leonard have each won it twice. The most recent award recipient is Marcus Smart of the Boston Celtics.

Although five of the first six winners were perimeter players, the award has traditionally been given to big men who rebound and block shots. Only eight perimeter players have been honored: Moncrief, Alvin Robertson, Michael Cooper, Michael Jordan, Gary Payton, Ron Artest (known now as Metta Sandiford-Artest), Kawhi Leonard and Marcus Smart. Payton and Smart are the only two point guards to have won. Jordan, Olajuwon, David Robinson, Kevin Garnett and Giannis Antetokounmpo are the only winners to have also won the NBA Most Valuable Player Award (MVP) during their careers; Jordan, Olajuwon and Antetokounmpo won both awards in the same season. In Olajuwon's case, he is the only one to have also won the NBA Finals MVP Award and the NBA championship in the same season. Jordan is the only recipient to have also won the scoring title in the same season, when he also became the only player to win the award while averaging over 30 points per game (35.0). On four occasions, the Defensive Player of the Year recipient was not voted to the NBA All-Defensive First Team in the same year. Robertson in 1986, Mutombo (1995), Tyson Chandler (2012), and Marc Gasol (2013) were instead named to the second team. Whereas the Defensive Player of the Year is voted on by the media, the All-Defensive teams were voted on by NBA coaches prior to 2014.

Winners

Multi-time winners

Teams

See also 
 NBA G League Defensive Player of the Year Award

Notes

References 
General

Specific

Defensive Player of the Year
National Basketball Association lists
Awards established in 1983